Sick is the second studio album by Sow released in 1998. This album spawned no singles. At this time Sow comprises Anna Wildsmith with "Boys", where the Boys are Raymond Watts, Euphonic, Sascha Konietzko, Hoppy Kamiyama & Optical 8, Martin King, and Günter Schulz.

Releases
Invisible Records #INV 128 CD - CD, 1998
Blue Noise #DRCN-25017 - CD, 1998

Track listing
"Ssik" - 6:55
"Jo The Lover" - 4:45
"Shrub" - 3:47
"Ego Head" - 6:13
"Strip" - 6:03
"K-Casino" - 8:21
"Wedge" - 6:34
"Working For God" - 6:50
"Scar" - 3:07

Total playing time: 52:35

Personnel
Euphonic – writing and instruments (tracks: 2, 5)
Hoppy Kamiyama and Optical 8 – writing and instruments (track 6)
Martin King – writing and instruments (track 8)
Dave Murder – additional engineering and mixing
Sascha Konietzko – writing and instruments (track 3)
Günter Schulz – writing and instruments (track 9)
Raymond Watts – production, writing and instruments (track: 1, 4, 7)
Steve White – additional programming and vocal recording
Anna Wildsmith – production, lyrics, vocal performance

Design
Martin Thompson – cover and additional photography

References

Sow (band) albums
1998 albums